RING finger protein 32 is a protein that in humans is encoded by the RNF32 gene.

The protein encoded by this gene contains two RING ring finger motifs. RING finger motifs are present in a variety of functionally distinct proteins and are known to be involved in protein-DNA or protein-protein interactions. This gene was found to be expressed during spermatogenesis, most likely in spermatocytes and/or in spermatids. Several alternatively spliced transcript variants exist, but their full length natures are not clear.

See also
 RING finger domain

References

Further reading

External links 
 

RING finger proteins